Bulduri is a residential area and neighbourhood of the city of Jūrmala, Latvia.

The Bulduri railway station was established in 1877. 
During the era of Imperial Russia, Bulduri was known to Western visitors as Bilderlingshof (Bilderliņi in Latvian)
Restaurant and nightclub Jūras Pērle (Sea Pearl) was built in Bulduri in 1965 according to plans by architect  and demolished in 1994.

References

External links 

Neighbourhoods in Jūrmala